The Dodge 440 is a full-size car that was marketed by Dodge from 1962 to 1964.
  For the Canadian market, the mid-priced big Dodge was marketed as the Polara 440, for 1965 and 1966.

Dodge Dart 440 (1962)

Introduced in 1962, the Dodge Dart 440 model was the upmarket trim version of the Dodge Dart. Included was the standard equipment of the Dart and Dart 330, plus backup lights and exterior moldings. The Dart 440 was available as a 4-door sedan, 2-door hardtop, 4-door hardtop, 2-door convertible and 4-door station wagon. The Dart 440 used the  wheelbase shared with the Dart, Dart 330, and Polara 500.

Standard was the  slant-six producing .  Claimed fuel economy in 1962 at a steady 40 mph was 24.1 mpg for the slant-6 engine. Optional were V8 engines that included the  2-barrel Chrysler A,  2-barrel,  2-barrel and 4 barrel Chrysler B, as well as the  4-barrel and dual 4-barrel Chrysler RB engines.  Power seats were $96.

Dodge 440 (1963-1964)

From 1963 the 440 was separated from the new, smaller Dart range. It now featured a 119-inch wheelbase shared with the 330 and Polara and available as a 2-door sedan, 4-door sedan, 2-door hardtop and 4-door station wagon.

During 1963 and 1964 model years, the Dodge 440 was the mid-range model. It featured less chrome and a plainer interior than the top-trimed Polara.

For the 1965 model year, the 440, along with the 330, was replaced by the Polara, with the 880 taking the Polara's place in the lineup on the new C Body with  wheelbase. The 426 engine was also no longer available in full-size Dodges. However, the name 440 stayed on as a trim level of the Dodge Coronet.

References

440
Full-size vehicles
Sedans
Cars introduced in 1963
Cars introduced in 1962
Cars discontinued in 1964